Herminio Campos (born 25 April 1937) is a Peruvian former footballer. He competed in the men's tournament at the 1960 Summer Olympics.

References

External links
 
 

1937 births
Living people
Peruvian footballers
Peru international footballers
Olympic footballers of Peru
Footballers at the 1960 Summer Olympics
Footballers from Lima
Association football goalkeepers